Abell S1077 is a galaxy cluster located in the constellation Piscis Austrinus.

References

Galaxy clusters
Piscis Austrinus